Christgau's Record Guide: The '80s is a music reference book by American music journalist and essayist Robert Christgau. It was published in October 1990 by Pantheon Books as a follow-up to Christgau's Record Guide: Rock Albums of the Seventies (1981).

The guide compiles approximately 3,000 capsule album reviews, most of which were originally written by Christgau for his monthly "Consumer Guide" column in The Village Voice throughout the 1980s. It covers a variety of genres and musical developments from the decade, which are given an overview in his introductory essays. More insight into his grading criteria is also given in the introduction.

The book was received positively by most critics. Christgau's sensibility and the qualities of his judgements were deemed  entertaining and insightful, although some regarded the writing as too challenging for most readers. It was succeeded in 2000 by Christgau's Consumer Guide: Albums of the '90s, forming a three-volume series of "Consumer Guide" collections.

Background 

Christgau's Record Guide: The '80s is the second in a series of books—beginning in 1981 with Christgau's Record Guide: Rock Albums of the Seventies—to compile, revise, and expand on Christgau's capsule album reviews, which were originally written for his monthly "Consumer Guide" column in The Village Voice throughout the decade specific to each volume. In the process of reviewing 20 records per month for the column, Christgau told the Chicago Tribune in 1990 that he had developed into a "processor" of music, with 12 to 14 hours of his day usually spent listening to albums:

Christgau later said he spent "a year or two" transforming the original reviews into this book, re-listening to albums twice.

Content and scope 
The book collects approximately 3,000 "Consumer Guide" reviews which range individually from 50 to 150 words—accompanied by a letter grade—and are arranged as entries, ordered alphabetically by the name of the album's recording artist, and annotated with year of release and record label. The styles of music covered throughout the collection include rock, pop, country, blues, jazz, hip hop, metal, punk rock, post-punk, and a variety of world musics, such as reggae and African genres. Among the first widely published reviewers of worldbeat music, Christgau included his critiques of music from countries such as Senegal, Nigeria, and South Africa.

In the book's introductory essay, Christgau identifies a two-pronged criteria ("importance" and "quality") for the music reviewed in the guide: "Importance divided into cultural impact (commercial or occasionally just sociopolitical reach, with added panache preferred), subcultural acclaim (especially from rock criticism's producers and consumers, but also from alternative radio and dance DJs), and past performance (increasingly problematic as more and more artists truck on into middle age). Quality boiled down to my grading system." Like the previous volume, the guide follows a grading schema on a scale of A-plus to E-minus, although there are far less records graded C-minus or lower in this volume. B-plus records are the most commonly reviewed in the book, and are defined by Christgau as those offering satisfactory listen through at least half their songs and encourage revisiting: "In school, B+ is a good grade—almost any student will settle for the near-excellence it implies. It's a compliment in the Consumer Guide too."

There are also introductory essays about musical developments and trends during the 1980s. In one essay, Christgau identifies the fusion of post-punk and post-disco sounds as one of the decade's major developments while coining the term "dance-oriented rock" to describe their synthesis. An appendix lists artists overlooked in the reviews and a "core collection" of albums before 1980, including out of print records categorized as "Gone But Not Forgotten". The book was also printed with a dedication to his daughter Nina, whom Christgau and his wife Carola Dibbell had adopted from Honduras in 1985.

Publication history 
Christgau's Record Guide: The '80s was first published in October 1990 by Pantheon Books and was reprinted in 1994 by Da Capo Press. A follow-up to The '80s—Christgau's Consumer Guide: Albums of the '90s—was published in 2000, forming a three-volume series of "Consumer Guide" collections. The contents of all three books were made available on Christgau's website after it went online in 2001 with the help of fellow critic and web designer Tom Hull, who also served as a resource for this book.

Critical reception 
Reviewing the book in 1991, John Lawson of the School Library Journal said it "works well not only by itself, but also as an update" of The New Rolling Stone Record Guide (1983) and The New Trouser Press Record Guide (1989), even if it covers only one decade of music. Australian Academic and Research Libraries, the journal publication of the Australian Library and Information Association, said Christgau "gives full rein to his pithiness and proves just how readable reference books can be". Fellow rock critic Greil Marcus remarked on the guide in 1990: "The entries covering a decade's work by a performer sometimes read like tiny novels, full of suspense, dramatic turnarounds, tragedy or farce. But what makes the book work is Christgau's endless capacity for surprise."

In the Los Angeles Times, Robert Hilburn believed the collection of capsule reviews reinforced a number of qualities about Christgau: how his interest extends beyond individual recording artists and into "the state of rock and in the richness of its culture"; how he "constantly challenges artists, fans and other critics to demand more of themselves and their favorites"; and "why he nurtures new and significant developments, however uncommercial or controversial." Hilburn regarded him as the premier reference for popular music, and the journalistic equivalent of Bob Dylan or Neil Young: "Quite simply, Christgau writes with the same reckless independence and ferocious eccentricity that fuels our most valuable pop artists." The book's "charged eloquence" embodied rock music in the mind of Chicago Tribune critic Greg Kot, who could not recommend it "highly enough", finding the entries on pop singer Debbie Gibson and hip hop group Public Enemy especially fun to read.

The book was not without criticism. Hilburn questioned Christgau's "grouchy dismissal" of U2's 1980 debut Boy while noting a partiality for third-world music records and an impenetrability as a writer, citing the review of the 1987 X album See How We Are as an example of the latter. Kot believed Christgau was less understanding of metal and also called some of the writing inaccessible: "Sometimes he assumes an intimate understanding of not only the record he's discussing but also a host of peripheral concerns that most of his readers could not possibly possess." Library Journals Barry Miller praised the broad-based musical coverage but deemed the writing glib and unctuous: "Christgau's catholic tastes provide a wonderful cornucopia, but the cumulative effect of his terminally hip prose and gymnastic verbal constructions ('boho Americanism,' 'antipunk discowave,' 'postprog art-rock,' 'mucho pusho,' etc.) is vacuous." Miller recommended The New Trouser Press Record Guide as an alternative of superior "depth and information".

Legacy and reappraisal 

Christgau's Record Guide: The '80s was used by the Music Library Association as a reference to prepare select rock recordings for A Basic Music Library: Essential Scores and Sound Recordings (1997), published by the American Library Association as a guide for librarians and other collectors. According to M. Thomas Inge's The Greenwood Guide to American Popular Culture (2002), Christgau's Record Guide: The '80s was a precursor to more popular music guide series—such as All Music Guide, MusicHound, and Rough Guides—and has since "maintained a resourceful timelessness ... Christgau's judgments are incisive, knowledgeable, and amusing."

In 2006, the "Consumer Guide" series was ranked fifth on The A.V. Clubs list of the 17 most essential popular music books, with The '80s singled out as the best of the three; an accompanying blurb said it covered a decade "when Top 40 and college radio were equally compelling, and Christgau could apply his naturally skeptical eye to artists who either bore the scrutiny, or shrunk away to nothing." The website's Michaelangelo Matos, who had been greatly influenced by Christgau, said the first two volumes were books he had read most frequently as an adult. Along with Christgau's ability to "distill a record's essence into a handful of words", Murray highlighted his humor, quoting "what remains the single best sentence ever written on Prince" from the review of Dirty Mind (1980): "Mick Jagger should fold up his penis and go home". Both the 1970s and 1980s guides were cited by Nashville Scene journalist Noel Murray as "seminal works for budding rock critics, who can learn from them the art of concision and the virtue of wielding strong opinions backed by a general spirit of enthusiasm." Veteran Washington, D.C.-based critic Mark Jenkins said he would "refer to them often, both for basic facts and pithy insights".

See also 

 Album era
 1980s in music
 Rockism and poptimism
 Spin Alternative Record Guide

References

Bibliography

Further reading

External links 
 

1990 non-fiction books
American anthologies
American non-fiction books
Books about pop music
Books about rock music
Books by Robert Christgau
Consumer guides
Encyclopedias of music
Music guides
Pantheon Books books
The Village Voice